Mercy Hospital South (formerly St. Anthony's Medical Center until October 1, 2018) is the third-largest medical center in Greater St. Louis and an affiliate of Mercy. It is the only designated Level II Trauma Center in either South St. Louis County or Jefferson County. The hospital is located in the unincorporated community, Sappington, Missouri just south of I-270 along Tesson Ferry Road (Missouri Route 21). It serves families in St. Louis County, St. Louis City, and Jefferson County, as well as Franklin County, St. Francois County, Ste. Genevieve County, and Washington County in Missouri, along with Monroe, Randolph and St. Clair counties in Illinois. In addition, Mercy Hospital South operates four urgent care facilities located in Arnold, Fenton, Kirkwood, and Lemay.

Mercy Hospital South has 767 licensed beds and is staffed by approximately 3,700 employees, 790 physicians and provides care to approximately 200,000 patients each year.

History
In 1900, the Franciscan Sisters, Daughters of the Sacred Hearts of Jesus and Mary, based in Wheaton, Illinois, opened St. Anthony's Hospital at Grand and Chippewa in south St. Louis City. The facility was named after Anthony of Padua, an early disciple of Francis of Assisi, who patterned his life and healing ministry after the example set by Jesus Christ. 

Following St. Louis' first polio epidemic in 1946, St. Anthony's Hospital became designated by the National Foundation for Infantile Paralysis (NFIP) as its Midwest Center for polio treatment. In 1947, convalescent children who had survived polio under the auspices of the NFIP—later known as the March of Dimes—and its city and county chapters were brought to this hospital. It became one of the country's largest polio rehabilitation centers, treating more than 100 polio patients per day. In 1954, the incidence of new cases of polio tapered off and the hospital began offering twice-yearly Salk polio vaccine clinics.

In 1967, the Franciscan Sisters transferred ownership and control of the hospital to a board of community leaders, making St. Anthony's the first Catholic hospital in the St. Louis area to be administered by a lay board. In 1975, St. Anthony's Medical Center opened at its present 
location at 10010 Kennerly Road. In 2017, St. Anthony's became affiliated with Mercy, which operates Mercy Hospital St. Louis. St. Anthony's officially changed names to Mercy Hospital South on October 1, 2018 to match the Mercy branding.

Russell and Fern de Greeff Hospice House
The Russell and Fern de Greeff Hospice House, known as Greeff Hospice House, provides traditional hospice care to terminally ill individuals who do not have a caregiver available to care for them at home. It is located on 3-1/2 acres of wooded property on the campus of Mercy Hospital South. Patients requiring de Greeff Hospice House services may have a caregiver who is unable to care for them any longer, symptoms that cannot be managed at home or no caregiver or resources to hire outside help.

History 
The hospice was greatly expanded in 1969.

In 1998, Russell de Greeff was diagnosed with terminal cancer. He was admitted to St. Anthony's Medical Center, St. Louis, Mo. He and his wife, Fern, saw a need and established an endowment for a freestanding hospice house to care for terminally ill individuals who had no one to care for them in their homes. Russell de Greeff died in June 1998, one year before the hospice house opened in 1999.

In 2006, the Hospice House expanded to care for 18 patients from the original 10 patients. Fern de Greeff died at age 100 in January 2010. Her name is now synonymous with generosity and hospice care in St. Louis.

Awards and recognition

 In 2011, St. Anthony's Medical Center earned the highest level of accreditation available as a Chest Pain Center with PCI (Percutaneous Coronary Intervention) from the Society of Chest Pain Centers. 
 In 2007, St. Anthony's was recognized for patient safety by an independent health ranking firm. 
 In 2006, St. Anthony's Medical Center was recognized with a Missouri Team Quality Award.

References

External links
 St. Anthony Med Center 

Healthcare in St. Louis County, Missouri
Greater St. Louis
Franciscan hospitals
Former Catholic hospitals
Hospitals established in 1900
Catholic hospitals in North America
Buildings and structures in St. Louis County, Missouri
1900 establishments in Missouri
Catholic health care